The Hihn Building, at 201 Monterey Ave. in Capitola, California, was listed on the National Register of Historic Places in 1973.

It is built of local redwood and is vaguely Classical in style.

It was deemed significant as "an excellent example of the style of architecture which was used by the Portuguese when they settled small farming and fishing villages and towns along the California coastline in the latter part of the 19th Century." It is Capitola's oldest commercial structure and is believed to have been built in 1883.

It was part of an effort by Frederick A. Hihn to develop a camping resort named Camp Capitola.

It was photographed by John Muir in 1972.

References

National Register of Historic Places in Santa Cruz County, California